Sampajañña (Pāli; Skt.: saṃprajanya, Tib: shes bzhin) is a term of central importance for meditative practice in all Buddhist traditions. It refers to "The mental process by which one continuously monitors one's own body and mind. In the practice of śamatha, its principal function is to note the occurrence of laxity and excitation." It is very often found in the pair 'mindfulness and introspection' or 'mindfulness and clear comprehension) (Pali: Sati sampajañña, Skt.: smṛti saṃprajanya).

Sampajañña has been variously translated into English as "continuity", "clear comprehension", "clear knowing", "constant thorough understanding of impermanence", "fully alert" or "full awareness", "attention, consideration, discrimination, comprehension, circumspection", and "introspection".

Princeton Dictionary of Buddhism entry
The Princeton Dictionary of Buddhism entry says;

From the Pali Canon

Clear comprehension is most famously invoked by the Buddha in tandem with mindfulness practice in the Satipaṭṭhāna Sutta:

Clear comprehension develops out of mindfulness of breathing (ānāpānasati) and is subsequently present in tandem with mindfulness for all four satipaṭṭhāna-s.

Canonical commentary

While the nikayas do not elaborate on what the Buddha meant by sampajañña, the Pali commentaries analyze it further in terms of four contexts for one's comprehension:
 purpose (Pāli: sātthaka): refraining from activities irrelevant to the path.
 suitability (sappāya): pursuing activities in a dignified and careful manner.
 domain (gocara): maintaining sensory restraint consistent with mindfulness.
 non-delusion (asammoha): seeing the true nature of reality (see three characteristics).

Contemporary commentary

Critical to Right Mindfulness' purpose (Nyanaponika)
In a correspondence between Bhikkhu Bodhi and B. Alan Wallace, Bhikkhu Bodhi described Ven.
... I should add that Ven.

See also 
 Asaṃprajanya – non-alertness, non-vigilance, etc.
 Buddhist meditation
 Mindfulness
 Samatha
 Satipaṭṭhāna
 Vipassanā

Notes

References 

 Anālayo (2006). Satipatthāna: The Direct Path to Realization. Birmingham: Windhorse Publications. .
 Bodhi, Bhikkhu (ed.) (2005). In the Buddha's Words: An Anthology of Discourses from the Pāli Canon. Boston: Wisdom Publications. .
 Nhat Hanh, Thich (trans. Annabel Laity) (1990). Transformation and Healing : the Sutra on the Four Establishments of Mindfulness .  Berkeley, CA: Parallax Press. .
 Nyanaponika Thera (1996). The Heart of Buddhist Meditation. York Beach, ME: Samuel Weiser, Inc. .
 Rhys Davids, T.W. & William Stede (eds.) (1921–5). The Pali Text Society's Pali–English Dictionary. Chipstead: Pali Text Society.  A general on-line search engine for the PED is available at http://dsal.uchicago.edu/dictionaries/pali/.
 Soma Thera (2003). The Way of Mindfulness. Kandy: Buddhist Publication Society. .
 Satipaṭṭhāna Sutta [The Establishing of Mindfulness Discourse] MN 10. (Translated from the Pali by Thanissaro Bhikkhu). dhammatalks.org. Retrieved from https://www.dhammatalks.org/suttas/MN/MN10.html.
 Vipassana Research Institute (VRI) (1996). Mahāsatipatthāna Sutta: The Great Discourse on the Establishing of Awareness. Seattle, WA: Vipassana Research Publications of America. .
 Wallace, B. Alan and Bhikkhu Bodhi (Winter 2006). The nature of mindfulness and its role in Buddhist meditation: A correspondence between B. Alan Wallace and the Venerable Bhikkhu Bodhi. Unpublished manuscript, Santa Barbara Institute for Consciousness Studies, Santa Barbara, CA.

External links

Buddhist philosophical concepts
Mindfulness (Buddhism)
Buddhist meditation